Moreda may refer to:

People
 Alicia Moreda, a Puerto Rican actress
 Eva Moreda, a Spanish female sky runner
 Tigist Moreda, an Ethiopian long-distance runner
 Juan Bazo de Moreda,  a Spanish noble

Places
 Moreda, Aller, one of 18 parishes in Aller, Spain
 Moreda de Álava, a town in Spain